"Standing Next to Me" is the second single released by The Last Shadow Puppets. It was released on 7 July 2008 in the United Kingdom on Domino Records. The song is the excerpted from the band's debut album The Age of the Understatement. The song entered the UK Top 40 at #30 on 13 July 2008.

Music video 
The video was shot in London by director Richard Ayoade. The music video shows Turner on tambourine and Kane on guitar performing the song with shadowing and a troupe of girls in matching striped dresses, but differently coloured leggings dancing.

Track listing

Charts

References 

2008 singles
2008 songs
The Last Shadow Puppets songs
Songs written by Alex Turner (musician)
Song recordings produced by James Ford (musician)
Songs written by Miles Kane
Domino Recording Company singles